= Xu Chengzhong =

Chinese professor

Chengzhong Xu
- Education: Nanjing University; University of Hong Kong
- Engineering career
- Institutions: Wayne State University

Chengzhong Xu from the Wayne State University, Detroit, MI was named Fellow of the Institute of Electrical and Electronics Engineers (IEEE) in 2016 for leadership in resource management for parallel and distributed systems.
